Giuseppe Santelli (Signa, January 20, 1880 – Signa, March 9, 1956) was an Italian painter.

References
Arnolfo Santelli, Un artista gentiluomo - Vita e viatico di Giuseppe Santelli, Edito dalla Società Leonardo da Vinci di Firenze.
Marco Moretti e O.Casazza, Giuseppe Santelli: Dipinti e disegni, Masso delle Fate Edizioni,1996
Marco Moretti, Bruno Catarzi Scultore 1903–1996, Masso delle Fate Edizioni, Signa, 2005, 
Giampiero Fossi, Oltre il novecento – Arte contemporanea nelle Signe, Masso delle Fate Edizioni, Signa, 2003, 

20th-century Italian painters
Italian male painters
People from Signa
1880 births
1956 deaths
19th-century Italian male artists
20th-century Italian male artists